Eugeniusz Grodziński (January 10, 1912, Pskov, Russian Empire – October 11, 1994,
Warsaw, Poland) was a Polish philosopher, whose principal interests
were philosophy of natural language, philosophical foundations of logic, and philosophical problems of psychology.

He was born as Yefim Grodziński in Pskov, Russian Empire, studied law, 
and in 1957 (during the Repatriation of Poles (1955–1959)) emigrated from Vilnius,
the Soviet Union to Warsaw, Poland.
Until his retirement, he was a professor at the Institute of Philosophy and Sociology (IFiS) of the Polish Academy of Sciences.

Books 
 Grodziński, E. 1969. Język, metajęzyk, rzeczywistość. Warszawa, Państwowe Wydawnictwo Naukowe
 Grodziński, E. 1978. Monizm a dualizm : z dziejów refleksji filozoficznej nad myśleniem i mową. Wrocław : Państwowa Akademia Nauk; OSSOLINEUM
 Grodziński, E. 1985. Językoznawcy i logicy o synonimach i synonimii : studium z pogranicza dwóch nauk. Wrocław : Zakład Narodowy im. Ossolińskich
 Grodziński, E. 1988. Koryfeusze nie są nieomylni : szkice polemiczne. Wrocław : Zakład Narodowy im. Ossolińskich
 Grodziński, E. 1986. Myślenie hipotetyczne : studium na pograniczu ontologii, filozofii języka i psychologii. Wrocław : Zakład Narodowy im. Ossolińskich
 Grodziński, E. 1983. Paradoksy semantyczne. Wrocław : Zakład Narodowy im. Ossolińskich
 Grodziński, E. 1980. Wypowiedzi performatywne : z aktualnych zagadnień filozofii języka. Wrocław : Zakład Narodowy im. Ossolińskich.
 Grodziński, E. 1983. Zarys ogólnej teorii imion własnych. Wrocław : Zakład Narodowy im. Ossolińskich
 Grodziński, E. 1981. Zarys teorii nonsensu (An outline of the theory of nonsense). Wrocław : Zakład Narodowy im. Ossolińskich
 Grodziński, E. 1964. Znaczenie słowa w języku naturalnym. Warszawa, Państwowe Wydawnictwo Naukowe.
 Grodziński, E. 1989. Filozoficzne podstawy logiki wielowartościowej. Warszawa, Państwowe Wydawnictwo Naukowe.

References 

1912 births
1994 deaths
Soviet emigrants to Poland
Jews from the Russian Empire
20th-century Polish philosophers
People from Pskov